This is a comparison of image file formats (graphics file formats). This comparison primarily features file formats for 2D images.

General
Ownership of the format and related information.

Technical details

See also
 List of codecs

References 

Graphics File Formats

Graphics file